Véronique Hivon (born 1970) is a Canadian politician in the  province of Quebec. Hivon was elected to represent the riding of Joliette in the National Assembly of Quebec in the 2014 provincial election. She is a member of the Parti Québécois.

Hivon graduated from McGill University with a degree in common law and a degree in civil law (1994) after brief studies at the University of Ottawa in political science. She also has a master's degree in planning and analysis of social politics from the London School of Economics and Political Science.

She worked as a researcher and law intern in 1994 but started to work as a lawyer starting in 2002 though she was admitted to the Quebec Bar in 1996. She also worked as a press secretary and Assistant Director to the Cabinet of the Minister of Justice and was also an assistant director of McGill's Law Faculty.

Hivon was first candidate for the PQ in 2007 but lost to then-Health Minister Philippe Couillard in the riding of Jean-Talon. Hivon defeated the ADQ's Pascal Beaupré in Joliette in 2008.

Hivon was re-elected in Joliette in 2012. The premier at the time, Pauline Marois, named her Minister of Social Services and Youth Protection. Hivon served concurrently as the Minister of the Lanaudière region and Minister responsible for the Die in Dignity commission, a commission about the right for a terminally-ill patient to end their own life. The Quebec legislature adopted the law (The Act Respecting End-of-Life Care) unanimously demonstrating a strong consensus on the project in Quebec.

In the Quebec provincial election of 2014, Hivon was again re-elected to the National Assembly but as a member in the opposition rather than in the government.

On December 1, 2015, the Supreme Court of Canada suspended the Act Respecting End-of-Life Care, declaring it unconstitutional. Then premier, Philippe Couillard, announced that the judgement would be appealed.

Following the resignation of Pierre Karl Péladeau as leader of the Parti Québécois, Hivon said that she was interested in running for leadership of the party.

Hivon announced in April 2022 that she would not run for another term in the 2022 Quebec general election.

References

External links
 
 Parti Quebecois biopage 

Lawyers in Quebec
Living people
Members of the Executive Council of Quebec
Parti Québécois MNAs
People from Joliette
Women MNAs in Quebec
Women government ministers of Canada
Canadian women lawyers
1970 births
21st-century Canadian politicians
21st-century Canadian women politicians
McGill University Faculty of Law alumni